A mayoral election was held in Surabaya on 9 December 2015, as part of the 2015 simultaneous local elections across Indonesia. The incumbent mayor, Tri Rismaharini, popularly known as Risma, was running for re-election against the former Provincial Secretary of East Java, Rasiyo. Risma won by a landslide margin of over 70%.

Candidates 
Two candidates ran in this election.
 Incumbent mayor, Tri Rismaharini, running with the incumbent deputy mayor and former deputy speaker of the Surabaya City Council, Wisnu Sakti Buana. The ticket was supported by the Indonesian Democratic Party – Struggle (PDI–P).
 Former Provincial Secretary of East Java under Governor Soekarwo, Rasiyo, running with former member of the House of Representatives, Lucy Kurniasari. The ticket was supported by the Democratic Party (PD) and the National Mandate Party (PAN).

Nominations 
The election was close to being postponed until 2017 as less than two candidates was registered by the end of the nominations period. At that point, there was no rules or precedence concerning walkover elections (the Constitutional Court ruled the legality of WO elections only on the end of September). Risma-Wisnu was the only pair who managed to submit nomination papers on time.

Before Rasiyo-Lucy was registered, two attempts were made to register a challenger to Risma. In early August 2015, the PD and PAN attempted to nominate former journalist, Dhimam Abror Djuraid, paired with Haries Purwoko. The registration failed after Haries withdrew in the last minute. As no other attempts was made until the end of the nomination period, the local electoral committee (KPUD) extended the nomination period until early September. Several weeks after the failed first attempt, Dhimas was nominated again, this time with Rasiyo as his running mate. The KPUD rejected their nomination due to errors in their nomination papers. The PD and PAN finally managed to register a ticket in their third attempt. On 8 September,  Rasiyo, paired with Lucy Kurniasari, were registered in the KPUD, ending the saga and allowing the election to proceed as scheduled.

Campaign

Results 
Risma's popularity allowed her to win re-election comfortably. Risma defeated Rasiyo by 86% to 14%, one of the biggest landslides in the 9 December elections.

|- bgcolor="#E9E9E9" align="center"
! colspan="2" align="left" | Candidates
! align="left" | Parties
! Votes
! %
|-
| bgcolor="" |
| align="left" | Tri Rismaharini
| align="left" | Indonesian Democratic Party – Struggle (Partai Demokrasi Indonesia-Perjuangan)
| 
| %
|-
| bgcolor="" |
| align="left" | Rasiyo
| align="left" | Demokrat (Partai Demokrat)
| 
| %
|-
| colspan="8" bgcolor="#E9E9E9" |
|-
! colspan="3" align="left" | Total
! 
! 100%
|-
| colspan="8" bgcolor="#E9E9E9" | 
|-
| colspan="3" align="left" | Valid votes
|  || %
|-
| colspan="3" align="left" | Spoilt and null votes
|  || %
|-
| colspan="3" align="left" | Turnout
|  || %
|-
| colspan="3" align="left" | Abstentions
|  || %
|-
| colspan="3" align="left" | Registered voters
| 
| bgcolor="#E9E9E9" |
|-
| colspan="8" bgcolor="#E9E9E9" | 
|-
| colspan="8" align="left" | Source: Central Electoral Committee (KPU)
|}

References 

Elections in East Java
2015 Indonesian local elections
Surabaya
Mayoral elections in Indonesia